Patrick Chalmers is the name of:

 Patrick Chalmers (MP) (1802–1854), Member of Parliament for Montrose Burghs
 Patrick R. Chalmers (1872–1942), Irish writer